Norman Scott Powell (né Barnes; November 2, 1934 – June 16, 2021) was an American television executive.

Biography
Norman Scott Barnes was born November 2, 1934, in Los Angeles. The son of actress Joan Blondell and cinematographer George Barnes, he was adopted by his mother's second husband, actor Dick Powell, in February 1938 under the name Norman Scott Powell. He had a sister, Ellen, from his mother's marriage to Dick Powell, and two siblings from Dick Powell's remarriage.

He was married to Ann Traub, with whom he had three children: Sandra, Scott, and Stephanie. After his divorce from Traub, he married Ellen Levine, with whom he had a son, Matthew.

Powell produced shows such as Gunsmoke and The Big Valley. He produced episodes of the 2002–03 season of the TV series 24 and the 2006 season of The Unit. He produced the award-winning documentary Brothers at War with director/producer Jake Rademacher and executive producers Gary Sinise and David Scantling.

Powell died on June 16, 2021, from acute respiratory failure.

Accolades
He was nominated for two Emmy Awards: Outstanding Drama Series for 24, and Outstanding Limited Series for Washington: Behind Closed Doors (1977). He was nominated for the Producers Guild of America Award for Producer of the Year in an Episodic Drama, for 24.

References

External links

Norman Powell at Find a Grave

1934 births
2021 deaths
American television executives
Television producers from California
Film people from Los Angeles
Burials at Mount Sinai Memorial Park Cemetery